Bogdan Burtea is a Romanian religious studies scholar and Semiticist currently based in Germany. His main interests are Mandaic, Aramaic, and Ethiopic studies.

Early life and education
Bogdan Burtea was born in Romania.

In 1999, Burtea obtained his Master's degree in Semitic Studies and Religious Studies, with a focus on History of Religions, at Free University of Berlin after graduating with a bachelor's degree from the same university. He then became a research assistant at the Seminar for Semitic and Arabic Studies at the Free University of Berlin, which was chaired by Rainer Voigt. He obtained his doctorate in Semitic Studies at the Free University of Berlin in 2003, with his dissertation supervised by Rainer Voigt and Kurt Rudolph.

Career
After graduation, in 2004, Burtea became a research assistant at the Department of Islamic Studies at the University of Erfurt, where he worked on the research project "The Influence of Globalization and Regionalization Processes in the History of the Eastern Church on the Emergence, Spread and Early Development of Islam in the 6th and 7th Centuries".

From 2011 to 2016, he was a research assistant at the Department of Religious Studies of the University of Zurich, where he worked on a research project relating to Ethiopian Orthodox Christianity that was funded by the Swiss National Science Foundation.

From 2004 to 2011, he was a research assistant at the Seminar for Semitic and Arabic Studies at the Free University of Berlin, where he worked on several Mandaic textual translation projects funded by the Fritz Thyssen Foundation and the German Research Foundation (DFG). In 2017, he was a visiting scholar in the BabMed (Babylonian Medicine) research project at the Free University of Berlin.

Since 2018, he has been a research associate at the Faculty of Theology of the Humboldt University of Berlin, supported by funding from the German Research Foundation.

Translations of Mandaic texts

Burtea is known for his German-language translations of several Mandaean religious texts, including:

Haran Gawaita in 2020
Diwan Abatur in 2020
Secrets of the Ancestors in 2012
Zihrun Raza Kasia in 2008
Scroll of the Parwanaya in 2005
Šafta ḏ-Dahlulia ("The Scroll of, i.e. against Evil Spirits", DC 20)
Zrazta d-Hibil Ziwa ("The Amulet of Hibel Ziwa," DC 44)

Selected works

References

External links
WorldCat

Living people
Academic staff of the Free University of Berlin
Religious studies scholars
Scholars of Mandaeism
Semiticists
Ethiopianists
Free University of Berlin alumni
Romanian expatriates in Germany
Year of birth missing (living people)
Translators from Mandaic
Romanian philologists
Translators to German
Romanian religion academics